Phil Robins (born 10 September 1954) is a Bahamian athlete. He competed in the men's triple jump at the 1976 Summer Olympics.

References

1954 births
Living people
Athletes (track and field) at the 1976 Summer Olympics
Bahamian male triple jumpers
Olympic athletes of the Bahamas
Place of birth missing (living people)